The Council on American–Islamic Relations (CAIR) is a Muslim civil rights and advocacy group. It is headquartered on Capitol Hill in Washington, D.C., with regional offices nationwide. Through civil rights actions, media relations, civic engagement, and education, CAIR promotes social, legal and political activism among Muslims in America.

Critics of CAIR have accused it of pursuing an Islamist agenda and have claimed the group is connected to Hamas and the Muslim Brotherhood, which CAIR has rejected and described as an Islamophobic smear campaign.

History 

The Council on American–Islamic Relations (CAIR) was created as an "organization that challenges stereotypes of Islam and Muslims" (CAIR letter to Vice President Gore, June 10, 1995), a "Washington-based Islamic advocacy group" (Press release, August 28, 1995) and an "organization dedicated to providing an Islamic perspective on issues of importance to the American public" (Press release, December 13, 1995). Prior to establishing CAIR, its founders observed that "the core challenge [in America], that of stereotyping and defamation, was having a devastating effect on our children and paralyzing adults from taking their due roles in civic affairs" ("The Link," a newsletter published by Americans for Middle East Understanding, February–March 2000). Within that understanding, they formed CAIR to challenge anti-Muslim discrimination nationwide.

Early years (1994–2001) 
CAIR was founded in June 1994.

CAIR's first office was located in Washington D.C., as is its present-day headquarters on Capitol Hill. Its founding was partly in response to the film True Lies, starring Arnold Schwarzenegger which Arab and Muslim groups condemned for its stereotyping of Arab and Muslim villains. The offices opened a month before the film's release. CAIR's first advocacy campaign was in response to an offensive greeting card that used the term "shia" to refer to human excrement. CAIR led a national campaign and used activists to pressure the greeting card company, which eventually withdrew the card from the market.

In 1995, CAIR handled its first case of hijab (the headscarf worn by Muslim women) discrimination, in which a Muslim employee was denied the right to wear the hijab; this type of complaint is now one of the most common received by CAIR's civil rights department.

CAIR continued its advocacy work in the aftermath of the April 19, 1995 Oklahoma City bombing of the Murrah Federal Building. Following the attack, Muslim-Americans were subjected to an upsurge in harassment and discrimination, including a rise in hate crimes nationally; 222 hate crimes against Muslims nationwide were reported in the days immediately following the bombing. The bombing gave CAIR national stature for their efforts to educate the public about Islam and religious bias in America; their report was featured on the front page of The New York Times on August 28, 1995, and was subsequently mentioned on ABC World News Tonight.

In 1996, CAIR began "CAIR-NET", a read-only e-mail listserve aimed to help American Muslims identify and combat anti-Muslim prejudice in the U.S. and Canada. CAIR-NET contains descriptions of news, bias incidents or hate speech and hate crimes, often followed by information as to whom readers may contact to influence resolution of an issue. CAIR also held its first voter registration drive in 1996; CAIR continues to encourage active political participation by American Muslims, for them to address political candidates and elected representatives with greater frequency.

In 1996, CAIR published a report The Usual Suspects regarding its perception of anti-Muslim rhetoric in the media after the crash of TWA Flight 800. Their research showed 138 uses of the terms "Muslim" and "Arab" in the 48 hours after the crash in Reuters, UPI, and AP articles covering the incident. The official NTSB report said that the crash was most likely caused by mechanical failure.

In 1997, CAIR objected to the production of sneakers made by Nike with a design on the heel similar to the Arabic word for "Allah". As part of an agreement reached between CAIR officials and Nike representatives, Nike apologized to the Muslim community, recalled the products carrying the design, launched an investigation as to how the logo came about, and built a number of children's playgrounds near some Islamic centers in America.

In 1997, as depictions of Muhammad are seen as blasphemous by most Muslims, CAIR wrote to United States Supreme Court Chief Justice William Rehnquist requesting that the sculpted representation of  Muhammad on the north frieze inside the Supreme Court building be removed or sanded down. About the request, CAIR spokesman Nihad Awad said, "We believe the court had good intention by honoring the prophet, so we appreciate that. We want to be flexible, and we're willing to pay for the changes ourselves." The court rejected CAIR's request in the end.

Post-9/11 (2001–present) 
CAIR increased its advocacy work again after the September 11 attacks. In October 2001, CAIR stated that it was opposed to the Afghan campaign of the US. By January 2002, four months after the attacks, the CAIR said that it had received 1,658 reports of discrimination, profiling, harassment, and physical assaults against persons appearing Arab or Muslim, a threefold increase over the prior year. The reports included beatings, death threats, abusive police practices, and employment and airline-related discrimination."

CAIR has conducted investigations, issued reports, held press conferences, filed lawsuits, and organized political action to protest aspects of U.S. counterterrorism policy.

From 2002 to 2004, CAIR organized the Library Project, an effort to provide resources about Islam to US libraries. The initiative sent a set of 18 books and tapes to public libraries written by Muslim and non-Muslim authors on Islamic history and practices, as well as an English translation of the Quran. As of December 2004, CAIR received 7,804 sponsorships for the $150 set. The project was funded in part by a $500,000 donation from Saudi Prince Al-Waleed bin Talal bin Abdul Aziz Al Saud.

In 2003, CAIR employee Randall "Ismael" Royer was indicted for his role in the Northern Virginia jihad terrorist network.

In 2005, CAIR coordinated the joint release of a fatwa by 344 American Muslim organizations, mosques, and imams nationwide that stated: "Islam strictly condemns religious extremism and the use of violence against innocent lives. There is no justification in Islam for extremism or terrorism. Targeting civilians' life and property through suicide bombings or any other method of attack is haram or forbidden—and those who commit these barbaric acts are criminals, not martyrs." The fatwa cited passages from the Quran and hadith that prohibit violence against innocent people and injustice, and was signed by the Fiqh Council of North America. Authors Kim Ezra Shienbaum and Jamal Hasan felt it did not go far enough in that it did not address attacks on military targets.

Also in 2005, following the Qur'an desecration controversy of 2005 at the Guantanamo Bay detention camp, CAIR initiated an "Explore the Quran" campaign, aimed at providing free copies of the Quran to any person who requested it. Nearly 34,000 Americans requested a copy.

In 2006, during the protests over cartoons depicting Muhammad, CAIR responded by launching an educational program "Explore the Life of Muhammad", to bring "people of all faiths together to learn more about the Islamic Prophet Muhammad and to use mutual understanding as a counterweight to the tensions created by the cartoon controversy". It provided free copies of a DVD or book about the life of Muhammad to any person who requested it. Almost 16,000 Americans requested materials. In June 2006, CAIR announced a $50 million project to create a better understanding of Islam and Muslims in the US. ($10 million per year for five years), in a project to be spearheaded by Paul Findley, a former US Congressman.

Also in 2006, CAIR sent a group of representatives to Iraq to urge kidnappers to release American journalist Jill Carroll. Carroll was eventually released unharmed.

in December 2006, California Senator Barbara Boxer  withdrew a "certificate of accomplishment" originally given to former CAIR official Basim Elkarra after Boxer's staff looked into CAIR, and she became concerned about some of CAIR's past statements and actions, and statements by some law enforcement officials that it provides aid to international terrorist groups.

In May 2007, the U.S. filed an action against the Holy Land Foundation (the largest Muslim charity in the United States at the time) for providing funds to Hamas, and federal prosecutors filed pleadings. Along with 245 other organizations, they listed CAIR (and its chairman emeritus, Omar Ahmad), Islamic Society of North America (largest Muslim umbrella organization in the United States), Muslim American Society and North American Islamic Trust as unindicted co-conspirators, a legal designation that can be employed for a variety of reasons including grants of immunity, pragmatic considerations, and evidentiary concerns. While being listed as co-conspirator does not mean that CAIR has been charged with anything, the organization was concerned that the label will forever taint it.

In 2007, the organization was named, along with 245 others, by U.S. Federal prosecutors in a list of unindicted co-conspirators or joint venturers in a Hamas funding case involving the Holy Land Foundation, which in 2009, caused the FBI to cease working with CAIR outside of criminal investigations due to its designation. CAIR was never charged with any crime, and it complained that the designation had tarnished its reputation. It has also been criticized for allegedly publishing propaganda

In response, National Association of Muslim Lawyers and National Association of Criminal Defense Lawyers sent a letter to Attorney General Alberto R. Gonzales, saying that the move to list the largest Muslim organizations in America as unindicted co-conspirators was an effort to smear the entire Muslim community. They also stated that the list breached the department's own guidelines against releasing the names of unindicted co-conspirators.

On October 22, 2007, the Holy Land Foundation trial ended in a mistrial. CAIR stated that the reason for the mistrial, and no convictions on any of the charges, was that the charges were built on "fear, not facts." All defendants were convicted upon retrial in 2008.

In 2008, the FBI discontinued its long-standing relationship with CAIR. Officials said the decision followed the conviction of the HLF directors for funneling millions of dollars to Hamas, revelations that Nihal Awad had participated in planning meetings with HLF, and CAIR's failure to provide details of its ties to Hamas. During a 2008 retrial of the HLF case, FBI Special Agent Lara Burns labeled CAIR "a front group for Hamas." In January 2009, the FBI's DC office instructed all field offices to cut ties with CAIR, as the ban extended into the Obama administration.

U.S. Congressmen Sue Myrick (R-N.C.), Trent Franks (R-Ariz.), John Shadegg (R-Ariz.), and Paul Broun (R-Ga.) wrote Attorney General Eric Holder on October 21, 2009, that they were concerned about CAIR's relationships with terrorist groups, and requesting that the Department of Justice (DOJ) provide a summary of DOJ's evidence and findings that led DOJ to name CAIR an unindicted co-conspirator in the Holy Land Foundation terrorism trial. The four Congressmen also wrote House of Representatives Sergeant at Arms Wilson Livingood a letter the same day asking that he work with members of the House Judiciary, Homeland Security, and Intelligence Committees to determine if CAIR was successful in placing interns in the committees' offices, to review FBI and DOJ evidence regarding CAIR's Hamas ties, and to determine whether CAIR is a security threat. Congresswoman Loretta Sanchez (D-Calif.), "appalled", said "I urge the rest of my colleagues to join me in denouncing this witch hunt." She was echoed by Keith Ellison (D-Minn.), the first Muslim elected to the U.S. Congress, in a speech that included a statement by the House's Tri-Caucus. The four Republican Congressmen, joined by Senator Tom Coburn (R-Okla.) and Congressman Patrick McHenry (R-N.C.), then wrote IRS Commissioner Douglas H. Shulman on November 16, 2009, asking that CAIR be investigated for "excessive lobbying". CAIR spokesman Ibrahim Hooper welcomed the scrutiny from Republican lawmakers, and said, "We've always stayed within our legal limits [for lobbying]. If anything, we don't have enough staff to lobby as much as we legally can."

CAIR condemned the Fort Hood shooting and expressed prayers for the victims and condolences for their families.

CAIR pointed to an arrest of five men in Pakistan on December 10, 2009, as a "success story" between Muslims and Muslim community organizations (like CAIR) and American law enforcement authorities. When the five men left Washington for Karachi on November 28, the families of the men discovered an extremist videotape. Worried, they contacted CAIR, which set up a meeting with the FBI on December 1, and the families shared their sons' computers and electronic devices with FBI agents. A U.S. law enforcement official described them as models of cooperation. CAIR hoped the event would ease "strained" relations of American Muslims with the FBI.

Hours after it was announced by President Barack Obama that Osama bin Laden had been killed, CAIR put out a statement:

We join our fellow citizens in welcoming the announcement that Osama bin Laden has been eliminated as a threat to our nation and the world through the actions of American military personnel. As we have stated repeatedly since the 9/11 terror attacks, bin Laden never represented Muslims or Islam. In fact, in addition to the killing of thousands of Americans, he and Al Qaeda caused the deaths of countless Muslims worldwide. We also reiterate President Obama's clear statement tonight that the United States is not at war with Islam.

In January 2012, CAIR's Michigan chapter took a stance along with the American-Arab Anti-Discrimination Committee in defending four Muslim high school football players accused of attacking a quarterback during a game. The players were allegedly targeted for criminal prosecution over the attack because of their ethnic origin. A judge later dropped the charges after deciding they had no merit.

CAIR has opposed proposed United States legislation and executive orders which would have designated the Muslim Brotherhood as a foreign terrorist organization, saying that such a designation would "inevitably be used in a political campaign to attack those same groups and individuals, to marginalize the American Muslim community and to demonize Islam."

In 2021 the director of the San Francisco branch of CAIR, Zahra Billoo, gave a speech labeling synagogues and major Jewish organizations including Hillel and the ADL as "enemies" and called for synagogues and these organizations to be monitored. She claimed these organizations were part of a "a well-funded conspiracy to marginalize us. We have to connect the dots between the organizations that promote Zionist agendas... they are the same ones that want to pass anti-sharia legislation." She went on to denounce a two-state solution to the Israeli-Palestinian conflict, saying "Allah has promised us victory." Her remarks prompted Jonathan Greenblatt, CEO of the ADL to accuse Billoo of promoting white supremacist rhetoric. On December 11, CAIR responded by defending Billoo's remarks.

Projects and media 
CAIR conducts research on the American Muslim community, releasing annual reports on public opinion and demographic statistics on the community, as well as annual Civil Rights reports concerning issues such as hate crimes, discrimination, and profiling. It also sponsors voter registration drives and outreach, and interfaith relations with other religious groups in America.

Local CAIR chapters such as the Michigan chapter organized a "Remember Through Service" campaign which was a video and billboard media campaign which featured positive representations of Muslim-Americans including a Muslim first responder during the September 11 World Trade Center events. The CAIR Arizona Chapter works with the non-partisan VoteRiders organization to spread state-specific information on voter ID requirements.

Litigation

Workplace discrimination 
One of the largest categories of cases CAIR deals with is workplace discrimination. CAIR has filed successful civil rights litigation on behalf of Muslim Americans who suffered employment discrimination due to their religion, including police officers and hospital workers. CAIR also filed an amicus brief on behalf of the plaintiff to the Supreme Court of the United States for Equal Employment Opportunity Commission v. Abercrombie & Fitch Stores, in which the Court ruled 8-1 that refusing to hire a woman because she may wear her hijab at the workplace amounts to religious discrimination in hiring.

Local government 
In 2012, after the City Council in St. Anthony, Minnesota voted 4–1 to reject a building plan for the Abu-Huraira Islamic Center, CAIR began legal proceedings and urged the federal government to investigate the city for violating the Religious Land Use and Institutionalized Persons Act. In 2014, the city agreed to a settlement after a federal lawsuit was opened against them, allowing the Abu-Huraira Islamic Center to begin services. CAIR also helped the American Islamic Center (AIC) file a complaint against the city of Des Plaines, Illinois to the US Department of Justice, after the city refused to allow the AIC to operate its place of worship. After a federal suit was filed, the city agreed to pay $580,000 to the AIC in a settlement agreement.

In 2012, CAIR successfully filed suit striking down a ban on Sharia law in Oklahoma on grounds that it violated the First Amendment right to free exercise of religion

In 2017, CAIR secured an $85,000 settlement for Kirsty Powell, whose hijab was forcibly removed by police while in custody.

Federal government 
CAIR has been involved in legal action against the US Government on several occasions. In 2003, CAIR along with the American-Arab Anti-Discrimination Committee filed suit in Muslim Community Association of Ann Arbor v. Ashcroft, which challenged the constitutionality of the USA PATRIOT Act. The case forced Congress to make substantial changes to Section 215 of the act, which helped it avoid being in violation of the First Amendment and had the effect of resolving the lawsuit. CAIR also filed amicus briefs against US President Donald Trump over Executive Order 13769 and Executive Order 13780, which banned all travellers and temporary visa holders of 7 Muslim-majority countries, as well as all refugees, from entering the United States. CAIR began maintaining a group of immigration lawyers in Chicago O'Hare airport after Executive Order 13769 went into effect and caused the immediate revocation of over 100,000 temporary visas.

CAIR litigated on behalf of Gulet Mohamed, a 19-year-old Virginia teenager who was kidnapped and tortured in Kuwait after the FBI placed him on a no-fly list. CAIR argued successfully that the teen's placement on the US no-fly list was "patently unconstitutional" and that Mohamed had a constitutional right to come home.

Muslim Mafia lawsuit 

The 2009 book Muslim Mafia: Inside the Secret Underworld That's Conspiring to Islamize America by Paul David Gaubatz and Paul Sperry portrays CAIR "as a subversive organization allied with international terrorists."

Consequently, CAIR brought a federal civil lawsuit in 2009 against Dave Gaubatz and his son for allegedly stealing documents, which were used in the making of Gaubatz's book. U.S. District Judge Colleen Kollar-Kotelly concluded that the Gaubatzs "unlawfully obtained access to, and have already caused repeated public disclosure of, material containing CAIR's proprietary, confidential and privileged information," which CAIR says included names, addresses, telephone numbers and e-mail addresses of CAIR employees and donors. As a result, the judge ordered Gaubatz to remove certain documents from his website. Judge Kollar-Kotelly also said that CAIR's employees have reported a dramatic increase in the number of threatening communications since the release of Mr. Gaubatz's book.

Operations 
CAIR's literature describes the group as promoting understanding of Islam and protecting Muslim civil liberties. It has intervened on behalf of many American Muslims who claim discrimination, profiling, or harassment. CAIR is a nonprofit 501(c)(3) organization with affiliates in 20 states (many of which manage multiple offices), and 33 chapters in the US. CAIR and its affiliates are managed by board members from 50 American cities, and combined employ more than 70 full-time staff.

Internal Controversies 
NPR (National Public Radio) "interviewed 18 former employees at the national office and several prominent chapters who said there was a general lack of accountability when it came to perceived gender bias, religious bias or mismanagement."

Gender Bias 
CAIR has been accused of ignoring sexual misconduct involving its leaders. NPR reported: "When concerned parties brought [gender bias] allegations to senior CAIR officials in Washington, D.C., and Florida, former employees said, there was little, if any, follow-up action. They said leaders were aware of some of the allegations as early as 2016."

Anti-union efforts 
NPR's investigation reported that CAIR “thwart[ed] employees' efforts to unionize in the national office in 2016.” “Service Employees International Union Local 500 said in filings Wednesday that the Council on American-Islamic Relations was trying to bust its effort to organize the civil rights group's staff. CAIR responded with a statement Thursday calling the charge ‘meritless.’”

Allegations of Islamist ties

Designation as terrorist organization by UAE
In November 2014, CAIR was designated a terrorist organization by the United Arab Emirates, due to alleged ties to the Muslim Brotherhood. UAE Minister of State for Foreign Affairs Anwar Gargash said groups, such as CAIR, may appeal the designation if their "approach has changed", as the law contains clauses allowing "organizations the availability to appeal through evidence and via the courts to have their names eliminated from the list." Gargash rejected criticism of the designation, saying "The noise (by) some Western organizations over the UAE's terrorism list originates in groups that are linked to the Muslim Brotherhood and many of them work on incitement and creating an environment of extremism."
 
CAIR called the move "shocking and bizarre," and some international terrorism analysts were also critical. The Washington Post wrote: "CAIR and the Muslim American Society are not alone in their shock. Diverse groups across Europe were also added to the list, leaving many observers perplexed at the scope and sheer scale of the list. Norway's foreign ministry publicly requested an explanation as to why one of the country's largest Islamic groups, the Islamic Organization, was included, and the U.S. State Department said they would be seeking more information from the U.A.E." In January 2015, CAIR said it would seek to appeal the designation in the UAE.

In an interview with Bret Baier of Fox News, UAE Foreign Minister Abdullah bin Zayed Al Nahyan was asked about the designation of CAIR as a terrorist group, in which he responded:

The United States government has not listed CAIR as a terrorist organization.

Hamas 

Critics of CAIR have accused it of having ties to the Palestinian Sunni-Islamic fundamentalist organization Hamas. Federal judge Jorge A. Solis said that there was evidence to show that CAIR has an association with the Holy Land Foundation, Islamic Association for Palestine, and Hamas. However, Judge Solis acknowledged that this evidence predates the official designation of these groups as terrorist organizations. On appeal, Judge Solis was rebuked for making these comments and for not paying enough attention to CAIR's rights under the Fifth Amendment. CAIR acknowledges that cofounder Nihad Awad declared support for Hamas in 1994, before it was designated a Specially Designated Terrorist by the United States in January 1995, a legal category established at that time. Since then CAIR has denounced violence by Hamas, and in 2006, Nihad Awad said, "I don't support Hamas today ... we condemn suicide bombings."

Six Republican members of the U.S. House of Representatives and Senate have alleged ties between the CAIR founders and Hamas. Both cofounder Omar Ahmad and Awad were involved previously with the Islamic Association of Palestine (IAP), a group described by the FBI, in 1993, as "intimately tied to the most senior Hamas leadership.", and participated in a meeting held in Philadelphia on October 3, 1993, with Hamas sympathizers and officials of the Holy Land Foundation (which was designated in 1995 by Executive Order and later designated in a 2008 court case, as an organization that had raised millions of dollars for Hamas). Based on electronic surveillance of the meeting, the FBI reported that "these participants took great pains to disguise their association with Hamas...referring to it simply as 'The Movement'."

In early 2007, The New York Times wrote that "more than one [U.S. government official] described the standards used by critics to link CAIR to terrorism as akin to McCarthyism, essentially guilt by association." At that time (prior to the Holy Land trial), the Times called efforts to link the organization to Hamas and Hezbollah "unsuccessful", citing a retired FBI official who was active through 2005 and who suggested that while "of all the groups, there is probably more suspicion about CAIR", you don't get "cold hard facts". The Times and The Washington Post also noted that even though a handful of its former members had faced prosecution, CAIR has never faced criminal charges.

As of 2007, FBI officials attended CAIR events. In 2009, Fox News said that the FBI broke off formal outreach contacts with CAIR, and shunned all of its local chapters, concerned about CAIR's ties to Hamas. In 2011, The New York Times said that while the FBI and CAIR had no "formal relationship", CAIR officials and chapters worked regularly with FBI officials. Foreign policy scholar Lorenzo G. Vidino notes that there are reasons for the FBI's continued work with CAIR, as some believe they are a necessary ally in counter-terrorism operations, regardless of their controversial status, history, and association with the Muslim Brotherhood.

Muslim Brotherhood 
Several academics and conservative leaning politicians have accused CAIR of being a Muslim Brotherhood affiliate or front organization in the United States. CAIR has rejected such associations as a smear campaign. According to Lorenzo G. Vidino, while CAIR is not a "Muslim Brotherhood organisation," CAIR has significant ties to the Muslim Brotherhood.

Reception

Criticism 
Some Muslims criticize CAIR for taking a conservative religious approach on many issues. These critics claim that statements by the organization (for example, that all Muslim women are required to veil) often follow conservative Saudi religious doctrine and do not capture diverse religious perspectives.

Steven Emerson has accused CAIR of having a long record of propagating anti-Semitic propaganda. In 2001 journalist Jake Tapper criticized the communications director of CAIR, Ibrahim Hooper, for saying about the September 11 attacks, "If Osama bin Laden was behind it, we condemn him by name," questioning why there should be any qualification before the statement.

Zuhdi Jasser has argued that CAIR's agenda is focused on "victimization." Best-selling author and prominent critic of Islamism, Sam Harris, criticized CAIR by saying the organization is "an Islamist public relations firm posing as a civil-rights lobby."

Praise 

U.S. Senator Barbara Boxer's 2006 decision to withdraw a "certificate of accomplishment" originally given to former CAIR official Basim Elkarra on grounds of suspicions about the organization's background "provoked an outcry from organizations that vouch for the group's advocacy, including the ACLU and the California Council of Churches. "They have been a leading organization that has advocated for civil rights and civil liberties in the face of fear and intolerance, in the face of religious and ethnic profiling," said Maya Harris, executive director of the ACLU of Northern California.

Pulitzer Prize-winning journalist Nicholas Kristof advocated for people to support and sign up as members of CAIR in response to the 2016 election of US President Donald Trump.

In 2016, the University of Saint Thomas named the Minnesota branch of CAIR as the winner of its Winds of Change Award at its Forum on Workplace Inclusion.

The Seattle chapter of the League of Women Voters awarded the Washington branch of CAIR one of its 2015 Champion of Voting and Civil Rights Awards, praising "their work encouraging voting and community involvement by members of the Muslim American community".

Funding 
CAIR has an annual budget of around $3 million (as of 2007). It states that while the majority of its funding comes from American Muslims, it accepts donations from individuals of any faith and also foreigners. In the past CAIR has accepted donations from individuals and foundations close to Arab governments. Within CAIR there is debate regarding foreign funding, and several CAIR branches have criticized the national office for accepting foreign donations.

In April 2011, Rep. Frank Wolf, R-Va. cited a 2009 letter sent from CAIR's executive director, Nihad Awad, to Muammar Gaddafi asking Gaddafi for funding for a project called the Muslim Peace Foundation at a U.S. House of Representatives Appropriations sub-committee hearing. Steven Emerson called the funding request "hypocritical", while CAIR spokesman, Ibrahim Hooper, said that the Muslim Peace Foundation was Awad's personal initiative "unrelated to CAIR", that CAIR didn't receive any money from the Libyan government, and also that CAIR was one of the first American organizations to call for a no-fly zone to protect Libyan citizens from Gaddafi during the 2011 Libyan Civil War.

See also 

 American Muslim Council
 Arab American Institute
 Islamic Information Center
 Muslim Public Affairs Council
 National Council of Canadian Muslims

References

External links 
 

Islamic organizations based in the United States
Political advocacy groups in the United States
Civic and political organizations of the United States
Civil liberties advocacy groups in the United States
Islamic political organizations
Organizations established in 1994
Organizations designated as terrorist by the United Arab Emirates
Opposition to Islamophobia
Islamic organizations established in 1994